Ositadimma Chinedu Nebo (born June 3, 1952, in Kafanchan) is an Archdeacon in the Anglican Church, a professor of Engineering and former Vice Chancellor of the University of Nigeria succeeded by Bath Okolo. He was appointed Minister of Power by the Nigerian former president Goodluck Jonathan on February 4, 2013. Prior to his appointment, Osita was the Vice Chancellor of Federal University Oye Ekiti from 2010 to 2013.

See also
List of vice chancellors in Nigeria

References 

Living people
Federal ministers of Nigeria
Academic staff of the University of Nigeria
Nigerian engineers
1952 births
Vice-Chancellors of the University of Nigeria